Jozef Novota (born 24 January 1986) is a Slovak football goalkeeper who currently plays for Fortuna Liga club FC ViOn Zlaté Moravce, on loan from OFK Sľažany.

Career

FC ViOn Zlaté Moravce
He made his professional debut for FC ViOn Zlaté Moravce against FC Spartak Trnava on 13 July 2014.

References

External links
 
 Futbalnet profile
 Fortuna Liga profile
 Eurofotbal profile

1986 births
Living people
Slovak footballers
Association football goalkeepers
FC ViOn Zlaté Moravce players
FC Nitra players
Slovak Super Liga players
People from Zlaté Moravce
Sportspeople from the Nitra Region